Baxter! is a 1973 British-American drama film directed by Lionel Jeffries and starring Patricia Neal, Jean-Pierre Cassel and Britt Ekland. The film follows a young boy called Roger Baxter who struggles to overcome his speech problem (rhotacism) and his strained relationship with his parents. The film was based on a book by Kin Platt, called The Boy Who Could Make Himself Disappear.

The film was made before Jeffries' third film as director, The Amazing Mr Blunden, but released afterwards.

Plot

Roger Baxter (Scott Jacoby), a young American boy with a speech impediment, goes to live in London with his mother (Lynn Carlin) after his parents' divorce. He struggles to pronounce the letter R, and at school he becomes close to his speech therapist (Patricia Neal). He makes friends with his upstairs neighbour Chris Bentley (Britt Ekland), whom he meets in the lift, and her French husband, Roger Tunnell (Jean-Pierre Cassel). He also meets  Nemo (Sally Thomsett), a girl who lives across the street from his flat. His parents are extremely self-centred and neglectful, and he feels isolated in a strange city. He eventually slides into an emotional breakdown.

Cast
 Scott Jacoby as Roger Baxter
 Patricia Neal as Doctor Roberta Clemm
 Jean-Pierre Cassel as Roger Tunnell
 Britt Ekland as Chris Bentley
 Lynn Carlin as Mrs. Baxter
 Sally Thomsett as Nora "Nemo" Newman
 Paul Eddington as Mr. Rawling
 Paul Maxwell as Mr. Baxter
 Ian Thompson as Dr. Walsh
 Ronald Leigh-Hunt as Mr. Fishie
 Frances Bennett as Mrs. Newman
 Dorothy Alison as Nurse Kennedy
 George Tovey as George
 Marianne Stone as Woman

Production
The Boy Who Could Make Himself Disappear was published in 1968. One critic called it "unforgettable".

In November 1971, it was announced the film would be called The Boy and it would be a co production between EMI Films and Group W Films.

The film starred Scott Jacoby, who had just played the lead in a TV movie, That Certain Summer. It was a rare English-language film for Jean-Pierre Cassel.

References

External links
 

1973 films
1973 drama films
British drama films
Films shot at EMI-Elstree Studios
Films about dysfunctional families
Films directed by Lionel Jeffries
Hanna-Barbera films
EMI Films films
1970s English-language films
1970s British films